Donal Keogan (born 13 April 1991) is a Gaelic footballer who plays at senior level for the Meath county team. As of 2016, Keogan was captain of the senior Meath football team, and also plays for his local club Rathkenny. In 2018, Keogan completed his PhD in Pharmaceutical and Medicinal chemistry from the Royal College of Surgeons in Ireland.

References

1991 births
Living people
Alumni of the Royal College of Surgeons in Ireland
Gaelic football backs
Meath inter-county Gaelic footballers
Rathkenny Gaelic footballers